Great and Little Leighs is a civil parish in the City of Chelmsford in Essex, England. The parish includes the villages of Great Leighs and Little Leighs. In 2011 the civil had a population of 2,709. The villages was mentioned in the Domesday Book in 1086, and was then called Leg(r)a. The parish was created in 1946.

References

Civil parishes in Essex
City of Chelmsford